Força Portugal (Portuguese for Forward Portugal) was a Portuguese right of center political alliance consisting of the Social Democratic Party and the People's Party. The parties contested together in the 2004 European Elections. The alliance won 33% of the votes and 9 seats. Seven of these seats went to the Social Democrats and two to the People's Party. Compared to the 1999 European Elections where the two parties contested separately, they lost two seats.

Election results

European Parliament

CDS – People's Party
Conservative parties in Portugal
Defunct political party alliances in Portugal
Social Democratic Party (Portugal)